Valentine Baxter Horton (January 29, 1802 – January 14, 1888) was a U.S. Representative from Ohio during the first two years of the American Civil War.

Biography
Born in Windsor, Vermont, Horton attended the Partridge Military School and afterward became one of its tutors.
He studied law in Middletown, Connecticut, and was admitted to the bar in 1830. He moved to Pittsburgh, Pennsylvania, where he practiced.

He moved to Cincinnati, Ohio, in 1833, and on to Pomeroy, Ohio, in 1835. He engaged in the sale and transportation of coal and the development of the salt industry. He served as member of the State constitutional convention in 1850.

Horton was elected as an Opposition Party candidate to the Thirty-fourth Congress and was reelected as a Republican to the Thirty-fifth Congress (March 4, 1855 – March 3, 1859). He was not a candidate for renomination in 1858.

He served as member of the Peace Conference of 1861 held in Washington, D.C., in an effort to devise means to prevent the impending war. He engaged in coal mining.  Horton was elected as a Republican to the Thirty-seventh Congress (March 4, 1861–March 3, 1863).  He was not a candidate for renomination in 1862 and returned to his home.

He died in Pomeroy, Ohio, January 14, 1888, and was interred in Beech Grove Cemetery.

References
 Retrieved on 2009-04-29

1802 births
1888 deaths
People from Windsor, Vermont
Opposition Party members of the United States House of Representatives from Ohio
Ohio Constitutional Convention (1850)
Politicians from Cincinnati
People of Ohio in the American Civil War
Ohio lawyers
Ohio University trustees
People from Pomeroy, Ohio
19th-century American politicians
19th-century American lawyers
Republican Party members of the United States House of Representatives from Ohio